Sofia Hultquist (born February 7, 1986) is an Italian composer and musician. Hultquist is best known for her band Drum & Lace and for co-scoring the fashion documentary The First Monday in May. She is also known to write music for soundscapes for fashion shows and presentations and is involved heavily in the fashion world.

Career

After graduating from Berklee College of Music with a degree in Film Scoring & Composition, Hultquist went on to earn a Masters in Music Technology and Composition from New York University. In 2010 she and her husband Ian Hultquist created their side project 'Aislyn'  where they remixed tracks for artists such as Neon Indian, Tokyo Police Club and more.  Following that, in late 2013 she founded her one-woman musical project Drum & Lace, which is still active.

Hultquist also composes for film and television, with her most well known work being The First Monday in May.

Personal life
Hultquist is married to fellow composer and musician Ian Hultquist.

Filmography

Film

References

External links 
 
 

1986 births
Italian composers
Living people
Women film score composers
Women television composers
Indie musicians
21st-century women musicians